The Altamont Historic District is a  historic district in Altamont, New York.  It was listed on the National Register of Historic Places in 1982, at which time it included 18 contributing buildings.

The district includes Delaware and Hudson Railroad Passenger Station (Altamont, New York), a train station that was individually listed on the National Register already.

Incomplete reference for Altamont HD, needs checking

References

Houses on the National Register of Historic Places in New York (state)
Federal architecture in New York (state)
Historic districts in Albany County, New York
Historic districts on the National Register of Historic Places in New York (state)
National Register of Historic Places in Albany County, New York